The 1990 Ealing Council election took place on 3 May 1990 to elect members of Ealing London Borough Council in London, England. The whole council was up for election and the Conservative party gained overall control of the council.

Background

Election result

Ward results

 2 from 94

References

1990
1990 London Borough council elections